Pragyan was the rover of Chandrayaan-2, a lunar mission developed by the Indian Space Research Organisation (ISRO), that launched in July 2019. Pragyan was destroyed along with its lander, Vikram, when it crash-landed on the Moon in September 2019 and never got the chance to deploy.

Overview

The rover was to move on 6 wheels traversing 500 meters on the lunar surface at the rate of 1 cm per second, performing on-site  analysis and sending the data to the Vikram lander, which would have relayed it to the Earth station. For navigation, the rover was equipped with:

Stereoscopic camera-based 3D vision: two 1 megapixel, monochromatic NAVCAMs in front of the rover to  provide the ground control team a 3D view of the surrounding terrain, and help in path-planning by generating a digital elevation model of the terrain. IIT Kanpur contributed to the development of the subsystems for light-based map generation and motion planning for the rover.
Control and motor dynamics: the rover design has a rocker-bogie suspension system and six wheels, each driven by independent brushless DC electric motors. Steering is accomplished by differential speed of the wheels or skid steering.

The expected operating time of Pragyan rover was one lunar day or around 14 Earth days, as its electronics were not designed to endure the frigid lunar night. Its power system had a solar-powered sleep/wake-up cycle implemented, which could have resulted in longer service time than planned.

 Dimensions: 0.9 × 0.75 × 0.85 m
 Power: 50 W
 Travel speed: 1 cm/sec.
 Planned mission duration: ≤14 days (one lunar day)

Planned landing site 

Two landing sites were selected, each with a landing ellipse of 32 km x 11 km. The prime landing site (PLS54) was at 70.90267 S 22.78110 E (~350 km north of the South Pole-Aitken Basin rim), and the alternate landing site (ALS01) was at 67.874064 S 18.46947 W. The prime site was on a high plain between the craters Manzinus C and Simpelius N, on the near side of the Moon.

The planned landing site and its alternate site, are located within the polar LQ30 quadrangle. The surface likely consists of impact melt, possibly mantled by ejecta from the massive South Pole–Aitken basin and mixing by subsequent nearby impacts. The nature of the melt is mostly mafic, meaning it is rich in silicate mineral, magnesium and iron. The region could also offer scientifically valuable rocks from the lunar mantle if the basin impactor excavated all the way through the crust.

Crash landing
The Vikram lander, carrying the Pragyan rover, separated from the Chandrayaan-2 orbiter on 7 September 2019 and was scheduled to land on the Moon at around 1:50 a.m. IST. The initial descent was considered within mission parameters, passing critical braking procedures as planned. The descent and soft-landing was to be done by the on-board computers on Vikram, with mission control unable to make corrections.

Initial reports suggesting a crash, have been confirmed by ISRO chairman K. Sivan, stating that the lander location had been found, and "it must had been a hard landing". The Lunar Reconnaissance Orbiter took images of the crash site, showing that the lander and the Pragyan rover inside the lander had been destroyed by the impact, creating an impact site and debris field spanning kilometres.

The orbiter part of the mission, with eight scientific instruments, remains operational and will continue its seven-year mission to study the Moon.

See also

 Artemis program, NASA's lunar program
 Indian Space Research Organisation
 Luna-Glob, Russian lunar program
 Lunar rover
 Rover (space exploration)

References 

Lunar rovers
Missions to the Moon
Space probes launched in 2019
Indian lunar exploration programme
2019 in India
ISRO space probes
Spacecraft launched by GSLV rockets
Spacecraft that impacted the Moon
Space probes decommissioned in 2019
2019 on the Moon